Okija is the largest town in Ihiala LGA of Anambra State in Southeast Nigeria. The town is the oldest of all the towns in Ihiala local government area, and one of the biggest towns in Igboland. The people of Okija are predominantly Christians. Okija is the home to Madonna University and Legacy University.  Bordered in the east by Ihembosi and Ukpor cities, within the west by olu or Ogbakubara, within the north by Ozubulu and within the south by Ihiala. In Okija, the Ulasi River on its flow to the Atlantic, joins Okposi river one of its tributaries.

Culture

Okija Shrine

The Okija Shrine or Ogwuwu Akpu is the popular local shrine in the city. It was a dispute settlement shrine where people with personal, land and business issues go to in order to seek adjudication by the gods.

Climate

Notable Nigerians from Okija
Okija is home to many notable Nigerians, including;

 Ebuka Obi-Uchendu a popular television and media personality
 Nze Akachukwu Sullivan Nwankpo (special adviser to Goodluck Jonathan, Former President of Nigeria)
Ifeanyi Chudy Momah

The vegetation of Okija

Is mainly forest with palm trees because the chief economic tree.

The land is of course terribly fertile, thus the chief occupation in Okija is farming or agriculture. Okija is that the largest food Producer in Ihiala L.G.A and Anambra State. She grows many huge and little yams, cassava, coco yams, maize, plantain and palm manufacture (oil and kernel), etc. The chief occupations in Okija is fishing, searching and animal-keeping (especially goats, sheep, pigs and fowls). Okija is once more the most important meat and fish producers and provider in Ihiala LGA.

Okija – Achala – Ogidi

According to one legend, Okija, Ihiala, Ihembosi and Uli had one father referred to as Achala, the son of Ogidi. this can be why Okija is a few times called Okija – Achala – Ogidi.

According to this legend, Okija was the primary son: Ihembosi, the second, Ihiala, the third, and Uli the fourth and last. Naturally, they need to decide on things and break Kola so as of seniority. This can be why Okija breaks Kola nut for all the cities in Ihiala LGA, the court of law connected cities, though settled at Ihiala, is thought as Achala city court up to nowadays.

THE THIRTY ONE VILLAGES IN OKIJA OR OKIJA “OHU EBO NA IRI;

1. Umuezedam, 2. Umuakporom, 3. Ugwucheleku, 4. Umuapani, 5. Ubahuagbugba, 6.Umudalaegwu (Uhuosu), 7. Umudioka, 8. Ezieke, 9. Umuokpala ezike, 10. Umuawa, 11. Umuchiuwa, 12. Umu- Uzu, 13. Umunakwa, 14. Ubahu-Ezike, 15. Umuezeobi, 16. Umunzele, 17. Uhudim, 18. Ohukabia, 19. Umuofo, 20. Umu-Ezewulum, 21. Uhungwu, 22. Isieke / Ubahudara, 23. Ubahueze, 24. Isifulu, 25. Etiti Umuhu or Umuhu, 26. Umuigwe, 27. Umuodogwu, 28.Ohuogwugwu, 29. Umuezim/ Ezimbala, 30. Umuanumoge, and, 31. Umunnafojolo.

Okija or the thirty one mentioned villages loosely divided into three;

1. Ubahu Abu Ubahu: This conjure Ubahu, Umuohi (Umunhi), ubahuezike and umuhu

2. Uhuobo and Uhuowere: This consists of Uhudim, Umuofo,  Ohukabia, Umuatuegwu and Uhuowere.

3. Ihite abu Ihite: This contains Ubahummonu, Ubahudara, Isieke and Ihite.

Traditionally or a few years gone, Okija city had no king or didn’t respect and regard someone because the chief of the thirty one villages in Okija. In those years, sturdy individuals assumed leadership of various villages and quarters.

Now Okija has its own city council. In recent years, His Royal Highness, Igwe (Sir) Emeka Nnamdi Okezie. Therefore the governance currently rests on the Igwe and also the native councilors still at the Okparas. People who facilitate within the regime of the city embrace the cohort (the age group) and Igwe in council.

Okija is currently represented in the Federal House of Representatives by Ifeanyi Chudy Momah

External links
 https://www.facebook.com/pages/Proudly-Okija/134586123356192?ref=ts&fref=ts
 Macabre discovery in Okija, Anambra State! - by Alfred Obiora Uzokwe
 OPINION :- The Ogwugwu Okija fairy tale - by Jimmie Asoegwu and Obi Anoliefo, courtesy of Vanguard and the Internet Archive
 "Okija: Shrine Saga Enters the Movies" 
 Understanding The Okija Shrine Phenomenon And The Art Of Mental Poisoning by Emmanuel U. Obi
 Full, Authentic List of Patrons of  Okija Shrine (Part Two)
 Horror: Police find 50 bodies, 20 skulls in Anambra shrine

Reference List

Populated places in Anambra State
Madonna University